Melissa van Neck (born 13 October 1991) is a Czech professional racing cyclist, who currently rides for UCI Women's Continental Team .

References

External links

1991 births
Living people
Czech female cyclists
Place of birth missing (living people)
Sportspeople from Zlín